Table tennis at the 22nd Southeast Asian Games was held at the Hai Duong Competition Hall, Hanoi, Vietnam from 6 to 12 December 2003.

Medalists

Medal summary

See also
Table tennis at the 2003 ASEAN Para Games

References

External links
  

2003
Southeast Asian Games
Table tennis competitions in Vietnam
2003 Southeast Asian Games events
Hanoi